Lieutenant-Colonel Sir Ian Douglas Campbell-Gray (14 July 1901 – 21 March 1946) was a British soldier serving in the Royal Engineers and an international fencer.

Biography
He competed in the individual and team épée fencing events at the 1936 Summer Olympics. He was a four times British fencing champion, winning the épée title at the British Fencing Championships, in 1926, 1930, 1932 and 1935.

His parents were Henry Tufnell Campbell and Ethel Evely Gray Campbell, Baroness Gray. He married Lady Diana Cavendish on 7 July 1942.

References

1901 births
1946 deaths
Royal Engineers officers
British male fencers
Olympic fencers of Great Britain
Fencers at the 1936 Summer Olympics
Sportspeople from London
20th-century British Army personnel